Embroidery City(湘绣城) is the biggest embroidery products production base in China. It is also included in the China National Intangible Cultural Heritage Protection and Research Base for the following functions: it researches and produces Hunan embroidery, clothes and home textiles, Chinese ceramics and silver jewelry and retains the production process of China's traditional crafts. In 2015 an accident occurred in their main factory. A disgruntled employee, not happy with his workplace conditions, set off 45 pounds of RDX explosive, killing between 6 and 14 employees.

References

Sources
Hunan Embroidery City Official Website www.echn.com.cn
The phenomenon of cultural prosperity in Hunan: Hunan embroidery. China Economic Information Journal, 2007 24
Hunan Embroidery Chrysanthemum Stone made the fifth-largest cultural industries. Star online. June 6, 2008
Hunan Xiang Embroidery City: China Folk Cultural Property of the banner.三湘都市报
Hunan, "Sange" naive million visitors are then "swept" Hunan Embroidery City
Tian Fang. Feng Jicai at the end of On the Road, Folk Culture. Changsha Evening News, May 20, 2009
Hunan Xiang Embroidery City, the financial crisis to straighten the backbone of national culture, the CPPCC Network, March 4, 2009
XIONG Yuan-fan. Folk crafts competing for the "Mountain Flowers Award." Hunan Daily, 2009 On June 5
Hunan Xiang Embroidery City into a national non-material cultural heritage protection research base, Changsha Evening News
https://cleanclothes.org/news/2015/07/13/call-for-action-after-chinese-factory-collapse
https://cleanclothes.org/news/2015/07/13/call-for-action-after-chinese-factory-collapse

Embroidery
Needlework